Baptist Quarterly is a quarterly academic journal of Baptist history from the London-based Baptist Historical Society, published by Taylor & Francis. It was established in 1922 as a successor to Transactions of the Baptist Historical Society. Editors-in-chief are Karen Smith of South Wales Baptist College and Cardiff University and Simon Woodman of King's College London. Editors include David W. Bebbington, William H. Brackney, Paul S. Fiddes, Bill J. Leonard, Ian Randall, and others.

Abstracting and indexing 
The journal is included in the Atla Religion Database and Scopus.

References

External links 

 Baptist Quarterly (1922 – present)
 Transactions of the Baptist Historical Society (1908–1922)

Protestant studies journals
Publications established in 1922
English-language journals
Quarterly journals